Shane Ryan (born 27 October 1993) is an Irish professional footballer, who played for the S.League (of Singapore) club Gombak United, as a striker.

References

1993 births
Living people
Republic of Ireland association footballers
Association football forwards
Gombak United FC players